Sungai Golok railway station is a railway station in Sungai Golok Sub-district, Su-ngai Kolok District, Narathiwat. It is a class 1 railway station  from Thon Buri railway station. Sungai Golok Station is the furthest railway station from Bangkok, and the terminus of the Southern Line.

History 
The station was opened on 17 September 1921 as part of the Southern Line Tanyong Mat–Su-ngai Kolok section. Su-ngai Kolok borders Malaysia. In the past, rail services used to extend to Rantau Panjang, across the Harmony Railway Bridge, over the Golok River. Later, Thai DMUs took up the entire schedule, up to Tumpat, and this soon led to protests and the disuse of this link. Nowadays, rail cross-border services at this checkpoint are closed. There have been talks about re-establishing this rail border crossing.

References 
 
 
 
 
 

Railway stations in Thailand
Railway stations opened in 1921